Electronic exams offer benefits such as ease of marking, reduced need to read illegible handwriting, saving of time

Emerging models
 eExam System: the first use of any eExam. for the award of a degree was in November 2009 at the University of Tasmania. It was subsequently adopted for university entrance examinations by the Tasmanian Qualifications Authority in 2011. In 2016 the eExam system became the subject of a national project in Australian universities. Security methods limit access to the eExam USB flash drive, prevent use of all communication channels, and require a unique desktop security image photograph for every sitting. The source code is available under open source GPL licences.
 CQUniversity Australia - eExam trial at the School of Engineering and Technology: A commercial product, Exam Pro software, was used in a supervised e-exam consisting of short  answer and essay-type questions.
 Abitti: the mission of the Abitti project is to transform all university entrance assessments in Finland to eExams by 2020. The source code is available under a GPLv3 license.
 RU exam system: this uses a Linux-based bootable USB exam system for students' laptops at Reykjavik University
 Secure-Exam-Environment: from Alpen-Adria-Universität Klagenfurt uses Moodle on a Knoppix-flavoured Linux distribution

Challenges
Many innovations face reactionary challenges in the social, political and technical spheres. Objections focus on the unreliability of computer equipment or the potential for cheating. Some 'hacks' against eExams use cooling of the computer RAM to 0 degrees Celsius, when the contents can be preserved for about 45 seconds. This is irrelevant if the exam question paper is published after the assessment and open source software is used (since the material is put in the public domain anyway). These criticisms have been answered by a risk tree comparison with paper-based examinations, finding the typing and handwriting in examinations are similarly secure.

The challenges of e-exams are: usability issues during the exam, increased stress level due to unfamiliarity with e-exam systems and inadequate functionality.

See also
 Electronic assessment

References

Bibliography
 Hillier, Mathew (2014). "The very idea of e-Exams: student (pre)conceptions" (PDF). Rhetoric and Reality: proceedings of ascilite 2014, 23–26 November, Dunedin, New Zealand. ASCILITE. Retrieved 16 August 2016.
 Mogey, Nora and Fluck, Andrew, “Factors influencing student preference when comparing handwriting and typing for essay style examinations”, British Journal of Educational Technology, 46 (4) pp. 793–802.doi:10.1111/bjet.12171
 Fluck, A and Pullen, DL and Harper, C, “Case study of a computer based examination system”, Australasian Journal of Educational Technology, 25 (4) pp. 509–523. DOI: http://dx.doi.org/10.14742/ajet.1126

Examinations